Craig Derek Cumming (born 31 August 1975 in Timaru) is a former New Zealand cricketer. He played for New Zealand in One Day Internationals and Tests. He played domestic cricket with Canterbury and Otago.

Domestic career
Cumming is a right-handed opening batsman who had played 99 First Class games, 103 "List A" or limited overs games and 9 Twenty20 games at the end of the 2006/2007 season. He played for Canterbury early in his career and debuted in First Class and "List A" cricket for them. Cumming has played for South Canterbury in the Hawke Cup.

International career
Cumming had a largely unsuccessful international test career, playing only 11 tests before being dropped due to lack of batting ability. He only made one half-century – a top score of 74 – and failed to reach three figures in any of his test innings. On 5 March 2005 against Australia, he was the recipient of what is considered the fastest ever ball bowled in New Zealand, bowled by Brett Lee, in which he clocked  at Napier as the fastest delivery of the over.

After cricket
Currently, he is a broadcaster for Newstalk ZB in Dunedin hosting local sports shows and producing 'The Country', which airs between midday and 1pm on Newstalk ZB and Radio Sport. He is also one of the domestic Sky Sport commentator for domestic cricket and international home matches, often giving titbits and trivia on cricket terms and hosting Dilmah tea parties during the tea breaks in Test matches.

Cumming is currently the head coach of the Otago women's cricket team.

References

External links

 
 

1975 births
Living people
Canterbury cricketers
New Zealand One Day International cricketers
New Zealand Test cricketers
New Zealand cricketers
Otago cricketers
Cricketers from Timaru
South Island cricketers